Filimonovo is a rural locality (a village) in Nikolotorzhskoye Rural Settlement, Kirillovsky District, Vologda Oblast, Russia. The population was 12 as of 2002.

Geography 
Filimonovo is located 30 km northeast of Kirillov (the district's administrative centre) by road. Sitkovo is the nearest rural locality.

References 

Rural localities in Kirillovsky District